The Lookout at Broad Cove Marsh at Inverness, Nova Scotia was designed by Omar Gandhi, founder of Omar Gandhi Architects.

It is located on the outskirts of Inverness, Cape Breton Island, Canada, between the ocean and a tree-lined country road that echoes its contours and is designed as a natural extension to its surroundings, with a slanted roof that mimics the hillside.  This long and low-profile house is securely rooted to the landscape by a concrete wall that anchors the structure on the uphill side. The angled-down roof protects the house from heavy winds, rain, and snow.

Architectural style and materials 
Omar Gandhi's projects are known for the modern vernacular architecture with clear forms and minimal material palettes. In order to enrich the simple barn geometry, a deliberate approach to the project's natural surroundings is taken through research to understand the site's narrative, topography, environmental conditions, and other site aspects. These principles are evident in the innovative use of materials, craftsmanship, built scale and form of this project.  Natural local materials such as wood including cedar, spruce, and birch is used for this project which roots the project in its place and helps give it meaning. Concrete is left exposed where possible and steel is allowed to weather naturally  The architecture of this inventive design is very modern. Floor-to-ceiling windows complement a combination of open and private rooms, providing unrivalled views of the ocean. As the residence is simply a single-loaded hallway furnished with minimalist and modern design, furniture, and amenities, the low-lying bar composed of concrete, wood, and glass is as eye-catching as it is functional. A 48-foot stretch of millwork anchors the whole corridor, making the home's pod-like sections seem both intimate and expansive.

Layout 
In terms of layout, one half of the house consists of an indoor/outdoor great space with rooms for sitting, cooking, and entertaining. This open area is anchored by an 18-foot-long island that serves as both a food prep area and an eating area. Three repeating pod-like modules on the opposite end of the home slide past the ocean-side windows to connect into the hallway, separating the private areas of bedrooms and baths. The pods are lined with white-washed locally sourced spruce boards of larger widths, in contrast to the concrete surface of the foundation (retaining wall and floor slab) and the fine-grain natural finish of the wooden service bars.

The getaway also has a lot of natural light owing to Omar Gandhi Architect's innovative design. The back elevation of the house features a retaining wall with a strip of glass above it that allows for additional natural light, and a piece of the kitchen roof lifts up to allow for more natural light to pass through.

References 

Buildings and structures in Inverness County, Nova Scotia